The Åkrafjord Tunnel is a road tunnel in Etne municipality in Vestland county, Norway. The tunnel was opened on 15 July 2000 to replace a narrow and winding road on the narrow shoreline between the fjord and the steep mountainsides.

References

Etne
Road tunnels in Vestland